Ctenucha quadricolor is a moth of the family Erebidae. It was described by Francis Walker in 1866. It is found on Jamaica.

References

Moths described in 1866
quadricolor
Moths of the Caribbean